Competition & Change is a peer-reviewed academic journal that covers the fields of political economy, globalization, financialization, global value chains and Critical Management Studies. The editors-in-chief are Hulya Dagdeviren (University of Hertfordshire) and Leo McCann (University of Manchester). The journal was established in 1995 and published by Maney Publishing, before switching to SAGE Publications in 2015. The journal is abstracted and indexed in Scopus.

References

External links 
 

Publications established in 1995
SAGE Publishing academic journals
English-language journals
Political science journals
Business and management journals
Economics journals
5 times per year journals